Nizhegorodsky District is an administrative district (raion) of South-Eastern Administrative Okrug, and one of the 125 raions of Moscow, Russia. Population: 32,000 (2010 est.).

See also
Administrative divisions of Moscow

References

Notes

Sources

Districts of Moscow